Inga Enna Solluthu is a 2014 Indian Tamil-language comedy film directed by Vincent Selva, and produced and written by Arunraj who also plays the lead role, with Meera Jasmine and Santhanam in supporting roles. The film released on 30 January 2014 and opened to negative reviews.

Cast 

 VTV Ganesh as Ganesh
 Meera Jasmine as Rajeshwari
 Santhanam as Ezhumugam (Sai Baba)
 Pandiarajan as Ramalingam
 Swarnamalya as Subha
 Ammu Ramachandran as Ganesh's sister
 Srinath
 Aarthi
 Ujjaini
 Mayilsamy as himself
 K. S. Ravikumar as himself
 Silambarasan as Raghu (Guest appearance)
 Andrea Jeremiah as Raghu's fiance (Guest appearance)
 Anthony as Anto (Guest appearance)
 Rajeevan as Rajeevan (Guest appearance)

Production 
The first look of Inga Enna Solluthu was released on 14 April 2013 with posters featuring VTV Ganesh, Meera Jasmine and Santhanam. It was revealed that the film would be directed by Vincent Selva, would have R. D. Rajasekhar, Anthony and Dharan handling the cinematography, editing and music respectively. The title of the film is taken from Ganesh's famous line from Vinnaithaandi Varuvaayaa. The team subsequently shot portions in Singapore. In May 2013, Ganesh roped in Silambarasan to play a guest role in the film and the team shot scenes with the actor in Goa.

Soundtrack 

Soundtrack was composed by Dharan Kumar. The audio launch was done in Suryan FM on 5 December 2013.

 "Kuttipayale" – Silambarasan
 "Appatucker" – Psycho Unit
 "Avan Ivan" –  Ramya NSK (lyrics by VTV Ganesh)
 "Cute Aana" – Naresh Iyer (lyrics by Lallu)
 "Ennodu" –  Naresh Iyer, Ramya NSK (lyrics by VTV Ganesh)
 "Pattampoochi" – VTV Ganesh (lyrics by VTV Ganesh)
 "Shuklambharatam" – Kalyani Menon

Critical reception 
Baradwaj Rangan wrote, "the episodes are so dull, the screenplay so crude and disjointed that we feel we've smoked some pot and slipped into a surreal dream". The Times of India gave 1.5 stars out of 5 and wrote, "This is the stuff of V Sekar's films in the 90s and some of those...were reasonably entertaining despite the didactic filmmaking...but, this film doesn't really have a clue on what it wants to be — a full-on drama, an existential comedy, or even a dramedy". The New Indian Express wrote, "The quick change of locations, crisp editing and Simbu's screen presence hold up the film, which, otherwise, would have been a total downer. It was a knot with potential. Selva could have worked out the screenplay in a more interesting manner". Sify wrote, "there isn't anything interesting in it. Director V Selva fails to make it interesting, characterisation is weak and it drags big time".

Rediff gave 1.5 stars out of 5 and called the film "a total waste of time". IANS gave 1 star out of 5 and wrote, "It is not because Ganesh plays the lead that Inga Enna Solludhu is unarguably boring, but because it is a shoddily written story that fails to entertain. It's a film that makes a success story look like a joke on screen". Deccan Herald wrote, "V T V Ganesh turns Inga Enna Solludhu into a putrefied ego trip, soaked in self-pity, thanks to director Vincent Selva pandering Ganesh's whims without much qualms about his own reputation".

References

External links 
 

2014 films
2014 comedy films
2010s Tamil-language films
Films shot in Goa
Indian comedy films
Films scored by Dharan Kumar
Films scored by Silambarasan